The 1992 German Athletics Championships was the 92nd edition of the national championship in outdoor track and field for Germany. It was held on 19–21 June at the Olympiastadion in Munich. It served as the selection meeting for Germany at the 1992 Summer Olympics. For the first time, women's pole vault and triple jump were contested.

The failed doping tests of Katrin Krabbe and Grit Breuer, two of Germany's best athletes, brought attention to the drug testing programme at the national championships.

Championships
As usual, due to time or organizational reasons, various competitions were not held as part of the main event in Munich. The annual national championships in Germany held separately from the main track and field competition comprised the following:

Results

Men

Women

References 
General
 Fritz Steinmetz: Deutsche Leichtathletik-Meisterschaften Band 4 (1988–1993). Hornberger-Verlag, Waldfischbach 1994
 Zeitschrift Leichtathletik DSV Deutscher Sportverlag Köln, Jahrgang 1992, Ausgaben mit Ergebnislisten zu den verschiedenen Wettkampfergebnissen bei Deutschen Leichtathletikmeisterschaften 1992
Results

External links 
 Official website of the German Athletics Association 

1992
Sports competitions in Munich
Athletics Championships
German Championships
Athletics Championships